is a train station on the Hankyu Railway Kobe Kosoku Line in Chūō-ku, Kobe, Japan.

Overview

Layout 
There are two eight-car-long side platforms at 2nd basement level serving two tracks.

Services 
Trains run 0455-0020 every day. The typical hourly off-peak weekday service is:
8 trains to Kobe-sannomiya, of which:
6 continue to Umeda as limited expresses (Kobe-sannomiya, Okamoto, Shukugawa, Nishinomiya-Kitaguchi, Jūsō, Umeda)
8 trains to Shinkaichi, of which:
2 continue to Himeji as locals (alternatively passengers can change at Kōsoku-Kōbe).

History 
Hanakuma Station opened on 7 April 1968.

The station was damaged by the Great Hanshin earthquake in January 1995. Restoration work on the Kobe Line took 7 months to complete.

Station numbering was introduced on 21 December 2013, with Hanakuma being designated as station number HK-17.

References

External links
 Station website 

Railway stations in Hyōgo Prefecture
Railway stations in Japan opened in 1968